Gair Mesa is the southernmost mesa of the Mesa Range, in Victoria Land, Antarctica.  It was named by the northern party of the New Zealand Geological Survey Antarctic Expedition, 1962–63, for H.S. Gair, geologist and leader of this party. This geographical feature lies situated on the Pennell Coast, a portion of Antarctica lying between Cape Williams and Cape Adare.

See also
Suture Bench

References

Mesas of Antarctica
Mountains of Victoria Land
Pennell Coast